Invisible is the fifth studio album by Leeland, released on July 22, 2016 through Bethel Music.

Critical reception

CCM Magazine's Matt Conner describes, "Leeland’s latest proves itself well worth the wait." Jonathan J. Francesco, in a NewReleaseToday review, states, "Leeland has crafted a worship album that should remind artists and listeners alike of what worship music can and should be." Chris Major of The Christian Beat writes, "For listeners wanting a flowing and moving collection of powerful, truth-filled worship music, Leeland's Invisible surpasses expectations."

Accolades
The song, "Lion and the Lamb", was No. 8 on the Worship Leaders Top 20 Songs of 2016 list.

On August 9, 2017, the Gospel Music Association was announced that the song "Lion and the Lamb" would be nominated for a GMA Dove Award in the Song of the Year and Worship Song of the Year categories at the 48th Annual GMA Dove Awards.

Track listing

Charts

References

2016 albums
Leeland (band) albums